Merle Shain (1935–1989) was a Canadian author and journalist.

Shain was born in Toronto, and graduated from the University of Toronto, with a BA (1957) and BSW (1959).

As a journalist, Shain worked as a feature writer for the Toronto Telegram, as an associate editor of the magazine Chatelaine, and as a columnist for the Toronto Sun. Shain also worked as a television presenter, hosting the CTV news program W5. For four years, she was a member of the board of the National Film Board of Canada.

Selected works
 Some Men Are More Perfect Than Others
 When Lovers Are Friends
 Hearts That We Broke Long Ago
 Courage My Love.

References

External links

1935 births
1989 deaths
Canadian newspaper journalists
CTV Television Network people
Canadian television journalists
Canadian women television journalists
Journalists from Toronto
Writers from Toronto
20th-century Canadian non-fiction writers
20th-century Canadian women writers